The 2017 German Darts Championship was the first of twelve PDC European Tour events on the 2017 PDC Pro Tour. The tournament took place at Halle 39, Hildesheim, Germany, between 24–26 March 2017. It will feature a field of 48 players and £135,000 in prize money, with £25,000 going to the winner.

Alan Norris was the defending champion, having beaten Jelle Klaasen 6–5 in the final of the previous edition, but he was defeated 6–4 in the third round by Kim Huybrechts.

Peter Wright won the final, defeating Michael van Gerwen 6–3, winning his second PDC European Tour title.

Prize money
This is how the prize money is divided:

Qualification and format
The top 16 players from the PDC ProTour Order of Merit on 6 March automatically qualified for the event and were seeded in the second round.

The remaining 32 places went to players from five qualifying events - 18 from the UK Qualifier (held in Barnsley on 10 March), eight from the West/South European Qualifier, four from the Host Nation Qualifier (both held on 23 March), one from the Nordic & Baltic Qualifier (held on 17 February) and one from the East European Qualifier (held on 25 February).

The following players took part in the tournament:

Top 16
  Michael van Gerwen (runner-up)
  Peter Wright (champion)
  Mensur Suljović (quarter-finals)
  Benito van de Pas (quarter-finals)
  Dave Chisnall (third round)
  Simon Whitlock (second round)
  Alan Norris (third round)
  Ian White (quarter-finals)
  James Wade (second round)
  Kim Huybrechts (quarter-finals)
  Gerwyn Price (semi-finals)
  Jelle Klaasen (semi-finals)
  Michael Smith (second round)
  Joe Cullen (third round)
  Stephen Bunting (third round)
  Cristo Reyes (third round)

UK Qualifier
  Ryan Searle (first round)
  Jamie Bain (second round)
  Darren Johnson (third round)
  Kirk Shepherd (first round)
  Chris Dobey (first round)
  Stephen Burton (first round)
  Mervyn King (second round)
  Paul Nicholson (second round)
  Diogo Portela (second round)
  Mick McGowan (second round)
  Ryan Meikle (first round)
  Chris Quantock (first round)
  Paul Harvey (second round)
  John Bowles (second round)
  David Pallett (second round)
  Richie Corner (second round)
  Kevin Painter (third round)
  Adam Hunt (first round)

West/South European Qualifier
  Christian Kist (second round)
  Ryan de Vreede (first round)
  Dimitri Van den Bergh (second round)
  Jermaine Wattimena (second round)
  John Michael (first round)
  Michael Plooy (first round)
  Jan Dekker (third round)
  Michael Rasztovits (first round)

Host Nation Qualifier
  Robert Allenstein (first round)
  Bernd Roith (first round)
  Martin Schindler (first round)
  Stefan Stoyke (first round)

Nordic & Baltic Qualifier
  Veijo Viinikka (first round)

East European Qualifier
  Krzysztof Ratajski (second round)

Draw

References

2017
2017 PDC European Tour
2017 in German sport
Sport in Hildesheim